Apatema junnilaineni is a moth of the family Autostichidae. It is found on the Canary Islands.

References

Moths described in 2001
Apatema
Moths of Africa